The Mucoraceae are a family of fungi of the order Mucorales, characterized by having the thallus not segmented or ramified. Pathogenic genera include Absidia, Apophysomyces, Mucor, Rhizomucor, and Rhizopus. According to a 2008 estimate, the family contains 25 genera and 129 species.

Genera
The family consists of the following genera:

 Actinomucor
 Apophysomyces
 Benjaminiella
 Chaetocladium
 Circinella
 Cokeromyces
 Dicranophora
 Ellisomyces
 Helicostylum
 Hyphomucor
 Kirkomyces
 Mucor
 Parasitella
 Pilaira
 Pilophora
 Pirella
 Rhizomucor
 Rhizopodopsis
 Rhizopus
 Sporodiniella
 Syzygites
 Thamnidium
 Thermomucor
 Zygorhynchus

References

 
Zygomycota
Taxa named by Barthélemy Charles Joseph Dumortier